Liu Zun (died 68 BC), posthumously King Huai of Zhao, was the ruler of Zhao Kingdom from 73 BC to 68 BC during the Western Han dynasty. 

His great-grandfather was Liu Qi (Emperor Jing of Han). He succeeded his father Liu Chang. After five years on the throne, he died without a son. The kingdom was without a ruler for the next two years until Emperor Xuan of Han installed Liu Zun's younger brother Liu Gao in 66 BC.

References 

Chinese kings
Han dynasty people

Year of birth unknown
68 BC deaths